State Gymnasium is an arena on the campus of Iowa State University in Ames, Iowa.  It was opened in 1913, and once was the school's primary indoor athletic facility, before the opening of Hilton Coliseum.  It is located at the corner of Union Drive, just north of the site of the former Clyde Williams Stadium.

The brick building was built in two years at a cost of $150,000.  It was intended for use as an armory and fieldhouse, something for which the school had been attempting to get funding since the early 1890s. The Iowa State basketball team played in the arena from 1913 until 1946. Beginning in 1946, home games were held in the Iowa State Armory, which continued until the construction of Hilton Coliseum in 1971. State Gym has since been renovated into recreational facilities, including four basketball courts, a swimming pool (the original home of the swimming team), tennis courts, a 1/12 mile indoor track, and other facilities for recreational sports.

References
 Iowa State Buildings by H. Summerfield Day, courtesy ISU Library

Sports venues in Iowa
Defunct college basketball venues in the United States
College wrestling venues in the United States
Iowa State Cyclones wrestling venues
Iowa State University buildings and structures
Iowa State Cyclones basketball venues
1913 establishments in Iowa
Sports venues completed in 1913
Basketball venues in Iowa